M82 X-1 is an ultra-luminous X-ray source located in the galaxy M82. It is a candidate intermediate-mass black hole, with the exact mass estimate varying from around 100 to 1000. One of the most luminous ULXs ever known, its luminosity exceeds the Eddington limit for a stellar mass object.

See also 

 M82 X-2

References

External links 
 Dying Star Reveals More Evidence for New Kind of Black Hole
 A medium-sized black hole? 

Intermediate-mass black holes
Ursa Major (constellation)